Events from the year 1528 in India.

Events

Births
 Birbal, Wazīr-e Azam of the Mughal court (died 1586)

Deaths
 Ravidas, mystic-poet of the Bhakti movement dies (year of birth uncertain)
 Rana Sanga, ruler of Mewar dies shortly after fighting in the Battle of Khanwa (born 1484)

See also

 Timeline of Indian history

References

 
India